Vjačeslavs Stepaņenko  (born 1977) is a Latvian politician and jurist.

Stepaņenko was a member of the parliament from 2002 to 2005 in parties "Par cilvēka tiesībām vienotā Latvijā" and Latvia's First Party.He is a former member of the Latvia's First Party/Latvian Way (LPP/LC) from 2007 to 2011.

In 2022, Stepaņenko started in the 2022 Latvian parliamentary elections from the party Sovereign Power.

References

External links
Saeima website

1977 births
Living people
Politicians from Daugavpils
National Harmony Party politicians
Latvia's First Party/Latvian Way politicians
Honor to serve Riga politicians
Deputies of the 8th Saeima
Deputies of the 9th Saeima
Latvian jurists